The 2000 WNBA season was the third for the Detroit Shock. The Shock were very close of making the playoffs, but they fell to the Washington Mystics in a tiebreaker.

Offseason

Expansion Draft
The following players were selected by the Miami Sol in the draft:

 Sandy Brondello (G), 6th pick
 Lesley Brown (F), 19th pick

WNBA Draft

Trades

Regular season

Season standings

Season schedule

Player stats

References

Detroit Shock seasons
Detroit
Detroit Shock